The Second Cabinet of Stevča Mihailović was a cabinet of the Principality of Serbia that was formed on May 6, 1876 and dissolved on October 13, 1878. This Cabinet saw some of the most decisive moments in the history of Modern Serbia, such as wars with the Ottoman Empire that finally led to the full independence of Serbia from the Ottomans.
In 1876, this cabinet declared the independence of Serbia and a War on the Ottoman Empire. This led to the Berlin piece Congress, in which the peace was established, and Serbia got its full internationally recognized independence and territorial expansion. Jovan Ristić, the Minister of Foreign Affairs, was Serbia's representative in Berlin.

Cabinet members

See also
Principality of Serbia
Stevča Mihailović
Jovan Ristić

References

Cabinets of Serbia
Cabinets established in 1876
Cabinets disestablished in 1878